Andover College, formerly known as Cricklade College, is a Further Education community college in Andover, Hampshire, England. It provides a range of academic and vocational courses to school leavers, adults, employers and the wider local community. Previously known as Cricklade College, the College changed its name following a merger with Sparsholt College Hampshire in 2007, forming one of the largest colleges in Hampshire. Andover College is a campus of Sparsholt College Hampshire.

Notable alumni
 Jamie Hince, musician
 Catherine Merridale, historian
 Robert Steadman, classical music composer
 James Tomlinson, cricketer

References

External links
 Andover College
 Sparsholt College

Andover, Hampshire
Further education colleges in Hampshire